Holoptelea is a genus of deciduous trees in the family Ulmaceae.

Species
, Plants of the World Online recognises two species:
Holoptelea grandis  – Africa
Holoptelea integrifolia  – Asia

References

Ulmaceae
Rosales genera
Taxa named by Jules Émile Planchon